The Roseto effect is the phenomenon by which a close-knit community experiences a reduced rate of heart disease.  The effect is named for Roseto, Pennsylvania.  The Roseto effect was first noticed in 1961 when the local Roseto doctor encountered Stewart Wolf, then head of Medicine of the University of Oklahoma, and they discussed, over a couple of beers, the unusually low rate of myocardial infarction in the Italian American community of Roseto compared with other locations.  Many studies followed, including a 50-year study comparing Roseto to nearby Bangor.  As the original authors had predicted, as the Roseto cohort shed their Italian social structure and became more Americanized in the years following the initial study, heart disease rates increased, becoming similar to those of neighboring towns.

From 1954 to 1961, Roseto had nearly no heart attacks for the otherwise high-risk group of men 55 to 64, and men over 65 had a death rate of 1% while the national average was 2%.  Widowers outnumbered widows, as well.

These statistics were at odds with a number of other factors observed in the community.  They smoked unfiltered stogies, drank wine "with seeming abandon" in lieu of milk and soft drinks, skipped the Mediterranean diet in favor of meatballs and sausages fried in lard with hard and soft cheeses.  The men worked in the slate quarries where they contracted illnesses from gases and dust.  Roseto also had very little crime, and very few applications for public assistance.

Wolf attributed Rosetans' lower heart disease rate to lower stress.  "'The community,' Wolf says, 'was very cohesive. There was no keeping up with the Joneses. Houses were very close together, and everyone lived more or less alike.'"  Elders were revered and incorporated into community life.  Housewives were respected, and fathers ran the families.

References 

Sociology of culture
Cardiology
Stress (biology)